Higher education in Saudi Arabia is the educational stage that follows the three years of secondary education. Higher education institutions are either governmental institutions or private institutions, and are mainly universities, colleges, and academies. There are three higher educational levels in Saudi Arabia: Bachelor's degree, Master's degree, and Doctorate. Governmental universities in Saudi Arabia offer free bachelor's degree education for Saudis and a monthly payment for each student during their studying period.

Bachelor's degree in Saudi Arabia takes 4 years in humanities and social science majors, medicine, pharmacology, engineering and applied sciences majors takes between 5 to 6 years of study. King Saud University was established in 1957, the establishment of this university marked the beginning of the contemporary higher education in Saudi Arabia. King Saud University is the first established university in Arab States of the Persian Gulf.

According to the governmental records, the number of Saudi students who registered for higher education in 2006 was 636,000 (268,000 were males, and 340,657 were females) 528,146 of them applied for bachelor's degree, 9,768 student applied for masters degree, and 2,410 student applied for doctorate. In addition, 93,968 students applied for intermediate diploma, and 1,953 students applied for higher diploma.

History 
The Saudi Ministry of Higher Education was established in 1975, to become the responsible entity of managing and laying the foundation of higher education in the kingdom. In 2015, the Ministry of Higher Education was merged with the Ministry of Education and became the Ministry of Education.

The College of Shariah and Islamic Studies in Makkah is the first higher educational institution in Saudi Arabia, it was established in 1949. King Saud University is the first modern university in Saudi Arabia. It was established in 1957 with only the Faculty of Arts and 21 students. Now the university has many faculties including college of Arts, Applied Sciences, Faculty of Engineering, College of Business Administration, Faculty of Computer Science and Information, College of Medicine, Pharmacology, College of Languages and Translation.

Universities 
There are more than 29 governmental universities, that consist of colleges and faculties that issue certificates and degrees in the BA, MA, and PhD levels in many majors. There are private colleges and community colleges that are a part of the governmental universities. There are also a number of academies around the kingdom, making 4 governmental Technical Colleges, 87 Intermediate Technical Colleges, and more than 38 public and private universities and colleges.

Research Centers 
Scientific research is one of the most prominent areas that the kingdom support, being one of the ways to shift the national economy from depending on oil to knowledge-based economy. There are more than 106 research centers in Saudi Arabia, several of them are massive such as King Abdulaziz City of Science and Technology (KAST), and King Abdullah City for Atomic and Renewable Energy (KA.CARE).

Higher education for women in Saudi Arabia
In 1976 the Higher Education Center for Women and several colleges of medicine and pharmacology for female students were established. In the late 1970s, the Saudi government offered more seats for Saudi female students to apply for higher education as a way of helping women achieve more at that time. According to the World Bank report, the number of Saudi female students in higher education outnumbered neighboring countries like Jordan, Tunisia, West Bank, Gaza City.

More than 60% of Saudi universities graduates are women. In Saudi Arabia, most women work in the educational sector, there are thousands of Saudi women holding PhDs. In 2008, the first batch of Saudi women graduated from the Faculty of Law. In October 2013, four women were awarded legal licenses to practice law in courts.

In 2009, Nourah bint Abdullah Al-Fayz became the first female minister. Nourah is a former teacher who studied in the United States and was appointed as Deputy Minister of the Ministry of Education. Princess Nora University is the first College for Women in Saudi Arabia and the largest globally, it has 32 campus around Riyadh city. In July 2020, Lilac ALSafadi was appointed as president of the Electronic University, making her the first female president of Saudi university that includes both male and female students.

Studying abroad 
The Ministry of Education provides its contributions to prepare and help Human Resources efficiently, to become a strong competitor on a local and global level, thus providing both governmental and private Saudi universities with qualified personnel.

In 2005, King Abdullah bin Abdulaziz established the Governmental Scholarships Program, to send the Saudi youth abroad to pursue higher education. The program provided fully funded scholarships that covers all students needs depending on the program period, more than 5000 Saudi students earned the scholarship in 2007/2008. Most of the students were studying at universities in Canada, United States, Australia, United Kingdom, New Zealand, Switzerland, France, Germany.

Saudi Digital Library 
The Saudi Digital Library is a massive digital library that contain more than 680,000 electronic book in many fields that support and meet the needs of beneficiaries in the higher educational sector in Saudi Arabia.

See also 

 Women's Rights in Saudi Arabia
 Education In Saudi Arabia
 King Abdulaziz University
 King Saud University

References 

Education in Saudi Arabia
Women's rights in Saudi Arabia
Government of Saudi Arabia